Ernesto Matozzi (19 May 1895 – 2 April 1964) was an Argentine footballer. He played in 24 matches for the Argentina national football team from 1916 to 1923. He was also part of Argentina's squad for the 1917 South American Championship.

References

External links
 

1895 births
1964 deaths
Argentine footballers
Argentina international footballers
Place of birth missing
Association football defenders